Edward William Cooper (born August 28, 1960) is a Canadian retired professional ice hockey forward who played 49 games in the National Hockey League for the Colorado Rockies. Cooper was born in Loon Lake, Saskatchewan, but grew up in Biggar, Saskatchewan.

Career statistics

External links
 

1960 births
Living people
Canadian ice hockey forwards
Colorado Rockies (NHL) draft picks
Colorado Rockies (NHL) players
Esbjerg Energy players
Fort Worth Texans players
Ice hockey people from Saskatchewan
Muskegon Mohawks players
New Westminster Bruins players
Portland Winterhawks players
People from Biggar, Saskatchewan
Wichita Wind players